Maria Avraamidou (born 6 October 1993) is a Cypriot female badminton player. In 2013, she became the runner-up of Cyprus International tournament in women's doubles event.

Achievements

BWF International Challenge/Series
Women's Doubles

 BWF International Challenge tournament
 BWF International Series tournament
 BWF Future Series tournament

References

External links
 

1993 births
Living people
Cypriot female badminton players